Zenit (meaning zenith) was the All-Union VSS. The name has been retained after the fall of the Soviet Union and the VSS system, notably by FC Zenit Saint Petersburg, which won the 2007 and 2010 Russian Premier League seasons, the 2007-08 UEFA Cup, and the 2008 UEFA Super Cup in association football.

Notable members
Yelena Davydova (artistic gymnastics)
Anatoly Mikhailov (athletics)
Mariya Pisareva (athletics)
Tamara Tyshkevich (athletics)
Galina Zybina (athletics)
Vladimir Nikitin (cross-country skiing)
Larisa Selezneva (figure skating)
Anatoli Fedyukin (handball)
Lyudmila Titova (speed skating)
Vladimir Salnikov (swimming)

See also
 FC Zenit (disambiguation), a number of European football clubs

External links
 Sport Flags of the USSR

Multi-sport clubs in Russia
Sport societies in the Soviet Union
1936 establishments in the Soviet Union